Margaret Evangeline (born 1943 in Baton Rouge, Louisiana) is a post-minimalist painter, video, performance, and installation artist noted for her bullet-riddled paintings.

Life
Evangeline was born in Baton Rouge, LA, and lived in New Orleans before moving to New York City in 1992. Evangeline received her M.F.A. and B.A. from the University of New Orleans. Evangeline has had more than forty solo exhibitions in the United States and abroad and has been awarded grants from the Pollock-Krasner Foundation, New York Foundation for the Arts, and the ART/OMI Foundation Artist in Residence.

Works
Evangeline’s diverse practice includes large-scale site-specific installations using mirror-like surfaces. In these installations, viewers can find their reflections moving through bullet-marked environments of woods or water, with outcomes sometimes documented in Evangeline’s videos.  The installations became linked with environmental art, as the shot mirror polished stainless steel panels she is known for begin as a performance in either the woods, the New Mexico landscape, or the sky, which are mirrored in the context of the artwork.  In New Orleans, she filled a cottage with fertile dirt from the Mississippi River, which sprouted new growth from seeds she planted.

As a process artist her work began to evolve to include autobiographical elements, which distinguishes her work from other process art. Her career-spanning monograph was published by Charta in 2011. Including an essay by Edward Lucie-Smith and an interview by Dominique Nahas, it was reviewed in The Brooklyn Rail article 'Margaret Evangeline: Shooting Through the Looking Glass'

Sabachthani, a book of photographs, essays and poetry centered around a project Evangeline carried out in collaboration with her son's military unit in Iraq, was also published by Charta in November 2012.

References

External links 

Margaret Evangeline artist gallery at stuxgallery.com

1943 births
Living people
Artists from Baton Rouge, Louisiana
Painters from New York City
American women sculptors
American women painters
University of New Orleans alumni
American women video artists
American video artists
American women installation artists
American women performance artists
20th-century American painters
21st-century American painters
American performance artists
American installation artists
20th-century American sculptors
20th-century American women artists
21st-century American women artists
Sculptors from New York (state)
American contemporary painters